Pedro Carmona-Alvarez (born 15 February 1972) is a Chilean / Norwegian novelist, poet and musician.

He made his literary debut in 1997 with the poetry collection Helter. Among his novels are La det bare bli blåmerker igjen from 2000 and Rust from 2009. He was awarded the Cappelen Prize in 2004.

Personal life
Carmona-Alvarez was born on 15 February 1972 in La Serena, Chile. A refugee with his family in Argentina as a child, he later settled in Norway.

References

1972 births
Living people
Chilean emigrants to Norway
20th-century Norwegian poets
Norwegian male poets
21st-century Norwegian novelists
Norwegian musicians
Norwegian male novelists
20th-century Norwegian male writers
21st-century Norwegian male writers